Alexander Nimmo FRSE MRIA MICE HFGS (1783 – January 20, 1832) was a Scottish civil engineer and geologist active in early 19th-century Ireland.

Life and career

Nimmo was born in Cupar, Fife in 1783, the son of a watchmaker, and grew up in Kirkcaldy. He may have been educated at Kirkcaldy Burgh School, then studied at the University of St Andrews and University of Edinburgh. His first role was as Rector of Inverness Royal Academy in 1802, aged only 19. Around 1805, he became a Commissioner for the Scottish Boundaries Commission. In 1811 he was elected a Fellow of the Royal Society of Edinburgh for his contributions to marine geology. His proposers were George Steuart Mackenzie, Alexander Christison, and Thomas Allan.

From 1811, he worked in Ireland as an engineer, with his first major task being for the Commission for the Reclamation of Irish Bogs. This was apparently on the recommendation of Thomas Telford. In 1814, he designed a new harbour at Dunmore in Waterford. In 1815, he improved the navigation on the river at Cork and improved the adjacent harbour at Cobh. Beginning in 1820, he was employed by the Irish Fisheries Board to make extensive surveys and recommendations for Irelands fishing harbours.

In 1830, he was commissioned by the Knight of Kerry to design a new village on Valentia Island in County Kerry, which was later named 
Knightstown. His maritime engineering designs combined classical motifs with utilitarian functionality. Among other projects, he is credited with designing the County Kerry village of Knightstown, the road from Galway to Clifden, and the harbour of Roundstone in Connemara. 

In the 1830s he redesigned over 30 harbours on the western Irish coast. At Limerick, one of his major projects was the Wellesley Bridge which was constructed between 1824-35. (It is now known as the Sarsfield Bridge.)

Nimmo died at his Dublin home on 20 January 1832.

Select works
 Poulaphouca Bridge, linking County Wicklow and County Kildare

Publications

Boscovitch's Theory (1812)
Navigation Inland (1821)
On the Application of the Science of Geology to the purposes of Practical Navigation (1823)

Further reading

References

External links

1783 births
1832 deaths
Scottish civil engineers
Harbour engineers
Scottish geologists
Scottish surveyors
People from Cupar
Alumni of the University of St Andrews
Alumni of the University of Edinburgh
Fellows of the Royal Society of Edinburgh
People from Kirkcaldy